Remembrance of Love is a 1982 war film directed by Jack Smight and starring Kirk Douglas. A reunion of Holocaust survivors in Israel brings together a couple who had been teenage lovers 35 years earlier in Poland during the Second World War. It aired as an NBC Monday Movie. Star Douglas’s real-life son Eric Douglas, 23, played his father in flashbacks. Actor and singer Robert Clary, a Holocaust survivor, appeared as himself.

Cast
 Kirk Douglas as Joe Rabin
 Robert Clary as himself
 Pam Dawber as Marcy Rabin
 Eric Douglas as Young Joe Rabin
 Chana Eden as Leah
 Yehuda Efroni
 Irit Frank as Young Leah
 Yoram Gal as David
 Gladys Gewirtz as Rose
 Michael Goodwin as Ken

References

External links
 
 

Films directed by Jack Smight
Films with screenplays by Harold Jack Bloom
American war films
1980s war films
NBC network original films
Syme Home Video
Films shot in Israel
Films set in Poland
American World War II films
1980s American films